John Verhoek (born 25 March 1989) is a Dutch professional footballer who plays as a striker for Hansa Rostock.

Career
Verhoek had stints at ADO Den Haag and Dordrecht.

Verhoek joined Rennes in January 2011 for a fee of €500,000 after spending six months with Den Bosch in the Eerste Divisie, the second level of Dutch football.

He joined MSV Duisburg in 2018 but left Duisburg on 19 July 2019  for Hansa Rostock, signing a deal with them that will keep him there until 2021.

Personal life
John Verhoek's brother Wesley Verhoek is also a professional footballer.

Career statistics

Club

References

External links

1989 births
Living people
People from Leidschendam
Association football forwards
Dutch footballers
Dutch expatriate footballers
Expatriate footballers in France
Expatriate footballers in Germany
Dutch expatriate sportspeople in France
Dutch expatriate sportspeople in Germany
FC Dordrecht players
FC Den Bosch players
Stade Rennais F.C. players
ADO Den Haag players
FSV Frankfurt players
FC St. Pauli players
1. FC Heidenheim players
MSV Duisburg players
FC Hansa Rostock players
Eredivisie players
Eerste Divisie players
Ligue 1 players
2. Bundesliga players
3. Liga players
Footballers from South Holland